
Gmina Dominowo is a rural gmina (administrative district) in Środa Wielkopolska County, Greater Poland Voivodeship, in west-central Poland.

Villages
Gmina Dominowo contains the villages and settlements of Andrzejpole, Bagrowo, Biskupice, Borzejewo, Bukowy Las, Chłapowo, Dominowo, Dzierżnica, Gablin, Giecz, Grodziszczko, Janowo, Karolewo, Kopaszyce, Marianowo, Michałowo, Mieczysławowo, Murzynowo Kościelne, Nowojewo, Orzeszkowo, Poświątno, Rusiborek, Rusibórz, Sabaszczewo, Szrapki, Wysławice and Zberki.

Neighbouring gminas
Gmina Dominowo is bordered by the gminas of Kostrzyn, Miłosław, Nekla, Środa Wielkopolska and Września.

References
Polish official population figures 2006

Dominowo
Środa Wielkopolska County